Justice Stephenson may refer to:

Donnan Stephenson, associate justice of the New Mexico Supreme Court
James B. Stephenson, associate justice of the Kentucky Supreme Court
M. L. Stephenson (c. 1838–1911), associate justice of the Arkansas Supreme Court
Roscoe B. Stephenson Jr., associate justice of the Supreme Court of Virginia
Will P. Stephenson, associate justice of the Supreme Court of Ohio